CENTREBET was an Australian bookmaker licensed in the Northern Territory.

CENTREBET originated from Alice Springs, Northern Territory and was the first bookmaker to be licensed in Australia in 1993 and the first bookmaker to go online in the Southern Hemisphere. CENTREBET was acquired by its biggest domestic rival, the SportOdds Group in 2003 for the sum of A$46.55 million. In 2005, SportOdds merged its CENTREBET, SportOdds.com and SuperOdds.co.uk businesses into one entity, known as CENTREBET.  In 2006, the company listed on the Australian Stock Exchange.

Centrebet was merged into competitor BetEasy as of August 13, 2018 and is no longer operating.

References

External links 
 188loto Official

Australian companies established in 1993
Gambling companies established in 1993
Online gambling companies of Australia
Poker companies
Gambling companies of Australia
Companies based in the Northern Territory